June Diane Raphael (born January 4, 1980) is an American actress, comedian, and screenwriter. She has starred in TV comedy programs Burning Love, Adult Swim's NTSF:SD:SUV::, and Grace and Frankie. Notable film work includes supporting roles in Year One and Unfinished Business, as well as her 2013 Sundance film Ass Backwards, which she co-wrote and starred in with her creative partner Casey Wilson.  She currently co-hosts both How Did This Get Made? alongside Jason Mantzoukas and her husband Paul Scheer, and The Deep Dive with Jessica St. Clair.

Early life

Raphael was born and raised in Rockville Centre, New York, to Diane and John Raphael, where she graduated from South Side High School in 1998. She is of Irish descent, and was raised Catholic. She has two older sisters, Lauren and Deanna.

Raphael attended New York University (NYU), where she studied acting at NYU's Tisch School of the Arts and the Stella Adler Studio of Acting. After graduating from NYU in 2002, Raphael and her best friend from college, Casey Wilson, studied improvisational comedy at the Upright Citizens Brigade Theater in New York City, where they would eventually run their two-woman sketch show for a number of years. Performing the long-running stage show opened doors for them as writers.

Career
Raphael began her comedy career writing and performing with the Upright Citizens Brigade Theatre (UCB) in New York and later in Los Angeles. Among her best known work at UCB was the long-running sketch show Rode Hard and Put Away Wet, written and performed alongside her comedy partner and best friend Casey Wilson; the stage show ran from 2003 to 2006 in New York and Los Angeles and was an official selection at 2005's US Comedy Arts Festival in Aspen, Colorado. Raphael and Wilson's comedic partnership has since branched out into an active writing career in film and television; they co-wrote their first screenplay for the comedy Bride Wars, in which they also appeared in supporting roles.

As a film and television actress, Raphael has made appearances on shows such as Party Down, Happy Endings, New Girl, and Lady Dynamite and in films such as Long Shot and Blockers. In 2010, Raphael co-starred as Barb in the improvised comedy series Players on Spike TV. She also starred in all three seasons of the web series Burning Love alongside Ken Marino and Michael Ian Black.

Raphael has collaborated with writing partner Casey Wilson on scripts for film and television. They most recently wrote and starred together in the raunchy female buddy comedy Ass Backwards, which also co-stars Alicia Silverstone, Jon Cryer, Vincent D'Onofrio, Paul Scheer, and Bob Odenkirk. The film premiered at the Sundance Film Festival on January 21, 2013. In 2013 it was reported that Raphael and Wilson were working on a second film to star in together, produced by Will Ferrell and Adam McKay's company Gary Sanchez Productions.

In February 2010, Raphael joined the rotating cast of the Off-Broadway play Love, Loss, and What I Wore (written by Nora Ephron and Delia Ephron) at the Westside Theatre in Manhattan. Raphael and Casey Wilson created the comedic stage show The Realest Real Housewives, which they starred in alongside Jessica St. Clair, Melissa Rauch, Danielle Schneider and Morgan Walsh. The show began running monthly at the Los Angeles Upright Citizens Brigade Theatre in 2011. Raphael also contributed short stories to the 2010 book Worst Laid Plans, based on the long-running stage show, in which she frequently performed.

Raphael co-starred in the Adult Swim action-comedy series NTSF:SD:SUV::, which aired for three seasons from 2011 to 2013. She currently co-hosts with her husband, Paul Scheer, the movie discussion podcast How Did This Get Made? along with comedian Jason Mantzoukas. The podcast is a roundtable discussion where Scheer, Raphael, Mantzoukas and other special guests "try make sense of movies that make absolutely no sense."

In 2015, Raphael took on a leading role as Brianna Hanson in the Netflix comedy series Grace and Frankie. Together with Kate Black, Raphael authored Represent: The Woman's Guide to Running for Office and Changing the World, a step-by-step guide for women who are considering a political career.

Personal life
Raphael is married to actor-comedian Paul Scheer. They met in January 2004, after first meeting when the artistic director of Manhattan's Upright Citizens Brigade Theatre brought Scheer in to offer advice to Raphael and her comedy partner Casey Wilson on making improvements to their UCB two-woman sketch show. They moved from New York to Los Angeles in 2005. In October 2009, they married at the Santa Barbara Museum of Natural History. They have two sons, born 2014 and 2016.

Raphael and comedian Kulap Vilaysack are the founders and directors of the Upright Citizens Brigade Theater (UCB) associated "UCB Corps" community, a volunteer charity organization. Raphael and Vilaysack organize charity events and projects to help improve the community, with the help of volunteers and other UCB performers "who want to make our world a better place".

Raphael is also co-founder of The Jane Club, a coworking space in Los Angeles for professional women.

Filmography

Film

Television

References

External links

1980 births
Living people
Actresses from New York (state)
American film actresses
American podcasters
American people of Irish descent
American stage actresses
American television actresses
American television writers
American women comedians
People from Rockville Centre, New York
Tisch School of the Arts alumni
American women screenwriters
American women television writers
Upright Citizens Brigade Theater performers
21st-century American actresses
Screenwriters from New York (state)
21st-century American comedians
South Side High School (Rockville Centre) alumni
American women podcasters